The Masters Guinot-Mary Cohr was a tennis team exhibition event played on clay the week before the French Open.  It features two teams, Guinot (Red) and Mary Cohr (Green). Both are made up of five players and 1 playing captain. The captains have been Marat Safin, James Blake, David Ferrer, and Michaël Llodra. Team Guinot currently hold a 2-1 series lead over team Mary Cohr, with the most recent tie (2012) being won by team Mary Cohr. Each match is played best-of-three sets, with a match tiebreak in place of a third set.

Four editions were held from 2009 to 2012, after which the sponsor, Guinot-Mary Cohr withdrew its support. The 2013 edition was cancelled while other sponsorship was sought. "Guinot" and "Mary Cohr" are brands of cosmetics sold by the Guinot-Mary Cohr group.

2009
Team Guinot won the tie by 4 matches to 2 after James Blake had the chance to make the tie a draw in the final rubber.

2010
Team Guinot won the tie by 4 matches to 2. After David Ferrer had the chance to leave the tie at a 3 all in the final rubber.

2011
The tie ended in a draw at 3 matches all, after Team Guinot Captain Richard Gasquet won the final rubber.
*Note: Ivan Ljubičić replaced Kei Nishikori, who withdrew due to sickness. Lleyton Hewitt, who had just returned from surgery, withdrew and was replaced by Nicolas Mahut. Novak Djokovic was originally due to play Mahut after Hewitt pulled out. However Djokovic needed to rest in preparation for the French Open. Thus Jo-Wilfried Tsonga replaced him to play his second match of the tournament. Then Julien Benneteau replaced Andy Murray when the latter pulled out with a groin injury.

2012

References

External links
Official website
Golf and Country Club

French Open
Tennis tournaments in France
Clay court tennis tournaments
Tennis in Paris
Exhibition tennis tournaments